"The Wife Aquatic" is the tenth episode of the eighteenth season of the American animated television series The Simpsons. It originally aired on the Fox network in the United States on January 7, 2007. 13.9 million viewers watched this episode, making it the highest rated of seasons 17–20.

Plot
In this episode, which parodies somewhat the film "The Perfect Storm", Marge pines for the excitement she had in her youth after watching Patty and Selma's old home movies of a trip to Barnacle Bay in New England during a town-wide outdoor movie night. Moved by his wife's depression, Homer organizes a surprise trip to the island. However, on the family's arrival, Marge's hopes to relive her youth are dashed as Barnacle Bay has been devastated by overfishing of the Yum Yum Fish, the island's main attraction. Homer refuses to let Marge down and fixes the boardwalk and celebrates with a large fireworks show. The plan backfires and he accidentally starts a fire and the boardwalk burns down. In order to repay the townsfolk, Homer joins a fishing crew and sets out to rediscover the Yum Yum Fish.

Homer mistakenly beer batters and deep fries the fishing hooks, attracting a large haul of Yum Yum Fish. However, their celebrations are short-lived as Homer and the crew become trapped in a storm. Searching for a means of escape, they discover Bart has stowed away and removed the lifeboat in order to hide. The ship sinks and Marge and the rest of Barnacle Bay believe that all is lost. Much to everyone's relief, Homer, Bart and the rest of the crew manage to survive and are rescued by a Japanese fishing boat called "Iruka Koroshi Maru" (Dolphin Killer). The townsfolk plan to recommence fishing, but Lisa warns them about the dangers of overfishing and how it brought their town to financial ruin. Agreeing with her, the townsfolk decide to go into logging instead, and clear cut the island's trees, which are planned to be sent to a paper mill to be made into issues of Hustler and Barely Legal magazine.

Reception

This was the highest rated episode since season 16's Homer and Ned's Hail Mary Pass, which aired right after Super Bowl XXXIX. Barring that, the ratings were last this high in 2004, with "I, (Annoyed Grunt)-bot" which had 16 million viewers.

Notes

External links 
 

The Simpsons (season 18) episodes
2007 American television episodes
Television episodes about the environment
Illegal, unreported and unregulated fishing